"Vitamina" is a song recorded by Colombian singer Maluma featuring American singer Arcángel. It was one of the three promotional singles featured in the short film X, and was released on 24 November 2017, alongside "GPS" and "23" as a promotional single from Maluma's third studio album F.A.M.E. (2018). The three promotional singles however, were not included in the final version of the album due to unknown reasons. It was written by Maluma, Arcángel, Stiven Rojas, Andrés Uribe, Kevin Mauricio Jiménez Londoño, Bryan Snaider Lezcano, Stiven Rojas and Joel Antonio López, and was produced by Rude Boyz. The promotional single has peaked at number 49 on the Billboard Hot Latin Songs chart.

Track listing

Charts

Release history

References

External links

2017 songs
2017 singles
Maluma songs
Arcángel (singer) songs
Spanish-language songs
Latin pop songs
Sony Music Latin singles
Sony Music Colombia singles
Songs written by Maluma (singer)